Elections were held in the organized municipalities in the Cochrane District of Ontario on October 27, 2014 in conjunction with municipal elections across the province.

Black River-Matheson

Cochrane

Hearst

Fauquier-Strickland

Iroquois Falls

Kapuskasing

Mattice-Val Côté

Moonbeam

Moosonee

Opasatika

Smooth Rock Falls

Timmins

Val Rita-Harty

References
Results

Cochrane
Cochrane District